Deshun Jackson, aka "Father Time", is an American streetball player from Bakersfield, California who has appeared on two ESPN television shows.  He was featured on season 2 of the AND1 Mixtape Tour television show on ESPN, and later on the show ESPN City Slam.  Jackson is 6-foot 1-inch tall and plays shooting guard.  He is known for his perimeter shooting skills.  In 2005, Jackson finished 2nd in the City Slam 3-Point Shooting Championships, losing in a close battle to "Black Jack" Ryan.  In 2009, Jackson participated in the SpikeTV show Pros vs Joes, where Jackson and 2 other "Joes" faced off against retired NBA players Ron Harper, Eddie Jones, and Shawn Kemp in a series of basketball related challenges.  In the final 3-on-3 contest, Jackson's team was able to defeat the former NBA players in overtime.  Jackson attended West High School in Bakersfield.

References 
 "Street Ball - The AND 1 Mix Tape Tour, Season Two". DVD. And 1, 2004.

AND1
Street basketball players
Year of birth missing (living people)
Living people